Giorno (Italian for “day”) is a surname. Notable people with the surname include:

 Francesco Giorno (born 1993), Italian footballer
 Guy Giorno (born 1965), Canadian lawyer and politician
 John Giorno (born 1936), American poet and performance artist

Fictional character
 Giorno Giovanna, a JoJo's Bizarre Adventure character appears in Part 5 of the series Golden Wind

Italian-language surnames